Asura coccineoflammens is a moth of the family Erebidae. It is found in New Guinea.

References

coccineoflammens
Moths described in 1913
Taxa named by Walter Rothschild
Moths of New Guinea